is a Japanese former competitive figure skater. She is the 2007 Japan Junior champion and placed 5th at the 2007 World Junior Championships. She won five ISU Junior Grand Prix medals.

Programs

Competitive highlights

References

External links 

 

1990 births
Japanese female single skaters
Sportspeople from London
Sportspeople from Tokyo
Living people